Edward Clinton Ezell (7 Nov 1939, Indianapolis, Indiana – 23 Dec 1993, Northern Virginia) was an American author and professor who served as National Firearms Collection curator at the National Museum of American History, administered by the Smithsonian Institution. He was also founding Director of the Institute for Research on Small Arms in International Security.

Background 

Ezell received an A.B. from Butler University in 1961 and M.A. from the University of Delaware two years later, where he was a Hagley Fellow. In 1969, he received his Ph.D. in the history of science and technology from Case Institute of Technology.

He taught at North Carolina State University and Sangamon State University, Springfield, Illinois.

Publications 
Ezell created the first oral histories on a pair of respected assault rifle designers — Mikhail Kalashnikov and Eugene Stoner of the AK47 and M16 respectively. Prior to his stint with the Smithsonian Institution, Ezell was employed by the National Aeronautics and Space Administration, beginning in 1974, to write about space projects. Publications include The Partnership: a history of the Apollo-Soyuz Test Project. The co-author, Linda Neuman Ezell, was also involved in writing On Mars: Exploration of the Red Planet.  
Other publications include:
 Small Arms of the World
 Personal Firepower
 Combat Handguns (co-authored with George C. Nonte)
 The Black Rifle: M16 Rifle Retrospective
 The AK47 Story: Evolution of the Kalashnikov Weapons
 The Great Rifle Controversy: Search for the Ultimate Infantry Rifle from World War II to Vietnam and Beyond
 Small Arms Today
 Handguns of the World
 Reflections on the Wall: The Vietnam Veterans Memorial
 The Partnership: A History of the Apollo-Soyuz Test Project

His book Small Arms of the World is considered a standard reference on military pistols, rifles, submachineguns, and light machineguns.

References

External links 
Mini-biography on Ezell at the Smithsonian
On Mars: Exploration of the Red Planet

1939 births
Writers from Indianapolis
Butler University alumni
University of Delaware alumni
Case Western Reserve University alumni
North Carolina State University faculty
University of Illinois at Springfield faculty
1993 deaths
20th-century American historians
American male non-fiction writers
20th-century American male writers
Historians of weapons